Ever since the collapse of Soviet Union, Turkmenistan has qualified for two Asian Cups, in 2004 and 2019. 

Turkmenistan reached the 2004 Asian Cup by finishing top of their qualifying group, ahead of the United Arab Emirates, a nation Turkmenistan defeated in the first game during qualifying. When they reached the 2004 edition, Turkmenistan could only manage one point, albeit against Saudi Arabia, who had reached the Asian Cup final in their previous five tournaments. 

As Turkmenistan is still an emerging nation, qualifying for the AFC Asian Cup is their greatest achievement in history, especially since Turkmenistan had chances to reach the Asian Cup in 2011 and 2015 via the AFC Challenge Cup, only for North Korea to defeat Turkmenistan in the final on both instances. 
That was none more evident when the country qualified for the 2019 edition. Turkmenistan's road began with a shock 1–0 loss to Guam, before an impressive 1–1 draw against Iran in June 2015. Due to the expansion of 24 teams for the 2019 Asian Cup, Turkmenistan got a second chance to play additional qualifiers, with their qualification to the tournament confirmed on 14 November 2017 thanks to a 2–1 victory over Chinese Taipei in Group E. Their last qualifier, a 4–0 loss in Bahrain, meant Turkmenistan qualified for the tournament despite a negative goal difference.

2004 China

Group C

2019 UAE

Group F

Record

References

Countries at the AFC Asian Cup
AFC Cup